Gudkov (from гудок meaning toot) is a Russian masculine surname, and its feminine counterpart is Gudkova. Notable people with the surname include:

Aleksei Gudkov (born 1972), Russian football player
Dmitry Gudkov (born 1980), Russian politician
Dmitry Gudkov (mathematician) (1918–1992), Russian mathematician
Evgeny Gudkov (born 1978), Russian Paralympic javelin thrower
Gennady Gudkov (born 1956), Russian politician and businessman
Lev Gudkov (born 1946), Russian sociologist
Tatyana Gudkova (born 1978), Russian race walker
Tatyana Gudkova (fencer) (born 1993, Russian fencer

Russian-language surnames